The Eddie Shore Award is presented annually to the AHL's best defenceman.  The award winner is chosen by AHL media and players. The award is named after Hockey Hall of Fame inductee Eddie Shore.

Winners

NHL-level Eddie Shore Award
One of the Boston Bruins annual team awards is also named the Eddie Shore Award. It is awarded to the player with most hustle and determination.

References

External links
Official AHL website
AHL Hall of Fame
Historic standings and statistics - at Internet Hockey Database

American Hockey League trophies and awards